Laura Intravia, also known as Flute Link, is an American instrumentalist, vocalist, and composer. She is best known for her performances on video game soundtracks and for concerts featuring video game music.

Career

Intravia began performing as an instrumental and vocal soloist for Video Games Live in 2009. She appeared on the Video Games Live televised PBS Special, performing on the "Chrono Trigger/Chrono Cross Medley," which was released on the accompanying album Video Games Live: Level 2. She also appeared on Level 3,, Level 4 and Level 5 as an arranger, solo instrumentalist and vocalist.

In 2013, Intravia was one of the artists featured on Austin Wintory's album of remixed music from the stealth game Monaco: What's Yours is Mine. The album was released in conjunction with the game and OST. In the same year, she arranged music from Journey for a piano sheet music book, published by Alfred Music Publishing. She later appeared as a guest vocalist for the accompanying recorded piano album with pianist Robert Thies. 

In 2014, Intravia performed as a solo vocalist at the world premiere of the new concert series Pokémon: Symphonic Evolutions, an official Pokémon project produced by Princeton Entertainment. The concert series debuted in Washington D.C., featuring Junichi Masuda as a guest conductor. She performed again the following month at the Mann Center.

Intravia arranged Through Time and Space, a Chrono Trigger and Chrono Cross piano arrangement album in 2015, featuring pianist Brendon Shapiro. The album was produced by Tommy Tallarico and released in conjunction with the Video Games Live: Level 4 Kickstarter. In 2016, Intravia's second album Shall We Play? featuring music from The Legend of Zelda: Majora's Mask was released.

In 2018, Intravia performed and co-wrote the ending song of the point-and-click adventure game Arkhangel: The House of the Seven Stars with lead composer Chad Seiter.

Video games
 Mobile Legends: Bang Bang (2021): vocalist, lyricist
 Spirit Oath (2020): vocalist
 Arknights (2019): vocalist
 Erica (2019): vocalist
 Mortal Kombat 11 (2019): vocalist
 Code Vein (2019): vocalist
 Mages of Mystralia (2019): flutist
 Sole (2019): flutist
 Darksiders III (2018): vocalist 
 God Eater 3 (2018): vocalist 
 Arkhangel: The House of the Seven Stars (2018): additional composition, lyricist, vocalist  
 Tin Hearts (2018): performer 
 THE IDOLM@STER CINDERELLA MASTER (2018): vocalist 
 Destiny 2 (2017): vocalist 
 Mages of Mystralia (2017): flutist 
 ReCore (2016): vocalist 
 Destiny: The Taken King (2015): vocalist 
 Dungeonmans (2014): flutist 
 Dragonvale (2013): flutist, recorder

Film/TV
 Los Angeles (2021): vocalist
 Scott The Woz (2021): flutist
 Tread (2020): vocalist
 Get the Girl (2017): vocalist

Discography

References

External links
 
 
 VGMdb
 OCReMix

1987 births
Living people
Place of birth missing (living people)
Video game musicians